Big Bird is a character in Sesame Street.

Big Bird may also refer to:

Songs
A 1968 song by Eddie Floyd
A 1983 song by The B-52s
A 2011 song by Andrew Jackson Jihad from the album Knife Man

People
Larry Robinson, former hockey defenceman
Mark Fidrych nicknamed "The Bird" after Big Bird
Joel Garner, West Indian cricketer, or his successor Curtly Ambrose

Others
Tokyo International Airport Terminal 1 (commonly known as Haneda Airport) in Ota, Tokyo
The KH-9 "Hexagon"  spy satellite
The Mexican Spanish language Big Bird, Abelardo Montoya
NokScoot airline call sign
A speciated Galápagos finch on Daphne Major, originally created from the mating of a non-native Española cactus finch (Geospiza conirostris) and the native Medium ground finch (Geospiza fortis). This is the first direct observation of Hybrid speciation.
 A derogatory name for someone or something considered annoying, meddling or bureaucratic, recently used this decade in reference to New York City's mayor, Bill de Blasio.  
Operation Big Bird
A high-energy cosmic neutrino detected by IceCube Neutrino Observatory in 2013
Suwon World Cup Stadium in Suwon

de:Sesamstraße#Bibo und Klein Bibo